A pilot ladder is a highly specialized form of rope ladder, typically used on board cargo vessels  for the purposes of embarking and disembarking pilots. The design and construction of the ladders is tightly specified
 
by international regulation under the SOLAS regime.

Construction
The spreader's function is to prevent the ladder from twisting in the prevailing weather conditions when in use. 

The lowest four steps of the ladder are normally made from a synthetic or composite resin, which is more resistant than hardwood, to the interaction between the host vessel and the pilot boat coming alongside.

Because the decks of most commercial ships are far above the waterline, pilots and others who need to come aboard at sea can usually only do so if a pilot ladder is put out. When not being used, the ladder is stowed away (usually rolled up) rather than left hanging.

See also
 Accommodation ladder
 Jacob's ladder

References

Watercraft components
Vertical transport devices

de:Jakobsleiter (Strickleiter)
it:Biscaglina
ru:Штормтрап